The Rapid City Thrillers were a semi-professional basketball team in Rapid City, South Dakota, that competed in the Continental Basketball Association beginning in the 1987 season. They were reincarnated in 1998 as an International Basketball Association franchise. One of the many notable players of the team was Keith Smart, who played for the Indiana Hoosiers when they won the NCAA tournament in 1987.

The Thrillers had some very notable head coaches in its time. First, Bill Musselman coached the team to three consecutive CBA titles during the 1980s.  Musselman then moved to the NBA as coach of the Minnesota Timberwolves.  Later, Flip Saunders coached the Thrillers for a season and later became head coach of the NBA's Washington Wizards.  Keith Fowler coached the team during one of their only losing seasons. Eric Musselman (son of Bill Musselman) coached the team successfully for seven years but was never able to bring the championship back to the franchise, although the team was runner-up three separate times during its existence.

This team traced its history back to the Tampa Bay Thrillers of the Continental Basketball Association. They won consecutive CBA titles in their first two seasons. However, the team never drew well, and abruptly changed cities in 1987. The Thrillers moved to Rapid City at the conclusion of the regular season, but didn't stop the team's momentum, as they won their third consecutive title.

After eight and a half seasons, the team moved to West Palm Beach where they became the Florida Beach Dogs. The Beach Dogs lasted only two seasons folding after losing the championship series to the Oklahoma City Cavalry.

After the Thrillers left Rapid City, professional basketball continued in the form of the Black Hills Posse of the International Basketball Association. In 1998 the Black Hills Posse were sold to John Tuschman (former owner of the original Thrillers). Tuschman tried to spark the old spirit the Thrillers had from the late 1980s and early 1990s, by renaming the Posse to the Thrillers and bringing back the original "flaming basketball" logo. Tuschman was unsuccessful and the new Thrillers folded after the end of the 1998–99 season. The IBA continued for one more season in Rapid City, as the Black Hills Gold played in the 1999–2000 season for one year, before moving to Michell, South Dakota and becoming the South Dakota Gold. Rapid City has been without professional basketball since.

Year-by-year

Notable players

Keith Smart
Brian Martin
Sidney Lowe
Ed Nealy
Freeman Williams
Richard Coffey
Shelton Jones
Stanley Brundy
"Jumpin'" Joe Ward
Larry Robinson
Fennis Dembo
Don Collins
Ledell Eackles
Craig Neal
Tony Dawson
Jarvis Basnight
Conner Henry
Mark Macon
Lorenzo Charles
Pearl Washington
Chris Jent
Manute Bol
Nate Johnston
Leon Wood
Alvin Robertson
Constantin Popa
Chris Whitney
George McCloud
Charles Smith
Corey Crowder

References

External links
Article Concerning the Thrillers move from Tampa Bay, FL to Rapid City, SD
Complete History of the Tampa Bay Thrillers

Continental Basketball Association teams
Defunct basketball teams in the United States
Basketball teams in South Dakota
Sports in Rapid City, South Dakota
1984 establishments in Florida